Bigelowia is a genus of North American flowering plants in the family Asteraceae, native to the United States.

Bigelowia plants are subshrubs, often forming clumps. They have very small but numerous displays of small yellow flower heads with disc florets but no ray florets.

Species
 Bigelowia nudata (Michx.) DC.	 – Louisiana Alabama Mississippi Georgia Florida South Carolina North Carolina 
 Bigelowia nuttallii L.C.Anderson – Texas Louisiana Alabama Georgia Florida

References

Astereae
Asteraceae genera
Flora of the United States